In the Line of Fire... Larger than Live is a live album by Power Metal band DragonForce released in 2015 and recorded on 18 October 2014 at Loud Park Festival.

The release marks the band's first live album to feature professionally shot footage at one of their concerts. It was made available in DVD and Blu-ray formats, with both versions including the audio CD with it.

Track listing

Personnel
DragonForce
Herman Li – guitars, backing vocals
Sam Totman – guitars, backing vocals
Vadim Pruzhanov - keyboards, backing vocal
Frédéric Leclercq – bass, backing vocals
Marc Hudson – lead vocals
Gee Anzalone – drums, backing vocals

Production
Produced by Herman Li
Mastered and mixed at Mix Unlimited by Damien Rainaud

References 

DragonForce albums
Metal Blade Records albums
2015 albums